Petros Kaloutsikidis (born 28 March 2001) is a Greek professional footballer who plays as a right-back for Super League 2 club AEL.

Career

PAOK
Petros Kaloutsikidis was a fast and capable striker who developed into a reliable wing-back. A title winner with the Under-19 side, he is prudent and hard working, as well as a good student. He was admitted to the Department of Technology and Science Administration of Kavala. He played on loan at Niki Volou for the season 2021-22.

References

2001 births
Living people
Greek footballers
Super League Greece 2 players
Football League (Greece) players
PAOK FC players
Niki Volos F.C. players
Athlitiki Enosi Larissa F.C. players
Association football defenders
Footballers from Thessaloniki
PAOK FC B players
21st-century Greek people